Ahsan-ul-Haq (16 July 1878 – died 29 December 1957) was an Indian cricketer. He was a hard-hitting right-handed batsman and a right-arm medium fast bowler.

Ahsan-ul-Haq went to England to study law where he played for Hampstead in club cricket. In June 1901, Haq scored 135 for Middlesex Second XI against Sussex Second XI.  In the next year, he played three first-class matches for Middlesex. But his official work restricted his appearances and he soon returned to India.

At the age of 45 he captained the Muslims in the Lahore tournament of 1924. On what was his first appearance in a first-class match on Indian soil, he went in last against Sikhs and scored 100 not out in 40 minutes, adding 150 in an unbroken tenth-wicket partnership with Abdus Salaam. Excluding centuries made under contrived circumstances, it is the second-fastest hundred (in terms of minutes) ever made in first-class cricket.

Haq was later involved in the creation of the Indian cricket board.

References
 Mohandas Menon, Indians in English county and university cricket, ACSSI Cricket Yearbook, 1990–91

External links

1878 births
1957 deaths
Indian cricketers
Middlesex cricketers
Marylebone Cricket Club cricketers
Muslims cricketers
Cricketers from Jalandhar
Punjabi people